Santa Fe (Spanish for 'Holy Faith'; , Tewa for 'white shell water place'; ; , Navajo for 'bead + water place') is the capital of the U.S. state of New Mexico. The name "Santa Fe" means 'Holy Faith' in Spanish, and the city's full name as founded remains  ('The Royal Town of the Holy Faith of Saint Francis of Assisi').

With a population of 87,505 at the 2020 census, it is the fourth-largest city in New Mexico. It is also the county seat of Santa Fe County. Its metropolitan area is part of the Albuquerque–Santa Fe–Las Vegas combined statistical area, which had a population of 1,162,523 in 2020. It replaced the previous capital, near modern Española, at San Gabriel de Yungue-Ouinge, which makes it the oldest state capital in the United States. It is also at the highest altitude of any of the U.S. state capitals, with an elevation of 7,199 feet (2,194 m).

Santa Fe is widely considered one of the world's great art cities, due to its many art galleries and installations, and it is recognized by UNESCO's Creative Cities Network. Its cultural highlights include Santa Fe Plaza, the Palace of the Governors, the Fiesta de Santa Fe, numerous restaurants featuring distinctive New Mexican cuisine, and performances of New Mexico music. Among its many art galleries and installations are the Georgia O'Keeffe Museum, a gallery by cartoonist Chuck Jones, and newer art collectives such as Meow Wolf. The cityscape is known for its adobe-style Pueblo Revival and Territorial Revival architecture.

Etymology 
Formal Spanish settlements were developed leading the colonial governor Pedro de Peralta to rename the area  ('the Royal Town of the Holy Faith of Saint Francis of Assisi'). The Spanish phrase  is translated as 'holy faith' in English.

History

Spain and Mexico

The area of Santa Fe was originally occupied by indigenous Tanoan peoples, who lived in numerous Pueblo villages along the Rio Grande. One of the earliest known settlements in what is known as downtown Santa Fe today came sometime after 900 AD. A group of native Tewa built a cluster of homes that centered around the site of today's Plaza and spread for half a mile to the south and west; the village was called Oghá P'o'oge in Tewa. The Tanoans and other Pueblo peoples settled along the Santa Fe River for its water and transportation.

The river had a year-round flow until the 1700s. By the 20th century the Santa Fe River was a seasonal waterway. , the river was recognized as the most endangered river in the United States, according to the conservation group American Rivers.

Don Juan de Oñate led the first Spanish effort to colonize the region in 1598, establishing Santa Fe de Nuevo México as a province of New Spain. Under Juan de Oñate and his son, the capital of the province was the settlement of San Juan de los Caballeros north of Santa Fe near modern Ohkay Owingeh Pueblo. Juan de Oñate was banished and exiled from New Mexico by the Spanish, after his rule was deemed cruel towards the indigenous population. New Mexico's second Spanish governor, Don Pedro de Peralta, however, founded a new city at the foot of the Sangre de Cristo Mountains in 1607, which he called La Villa Real de la Santa Fe de San Francisco de Asís, the Royal Town of the Holy Faith of Saint Francis of Assisi. In 1610, he designated it as the capital of the province, which it has almost constantly remained, making it the oldest state capital in the United States.

Lack of Native American representation within the province of Santa Fe de Nuevo México, New Spain (current New Mexico's early government) led to the 1680 Pueblo Revolt, when groups of different Native Pueblo peoples were successful in driving the Spaniards out of New Mexico to El Paso. The Pueblo people continued running New Mexico from the Palace of the Governors in Santa Fe from 1680 to 1692. The territory was reconquered in 1692 by Don Diego de Vargas through the so-called  "Bloodless Reconquest", which was criticized as violent even at the time. The next governor, started to broker peace, including the founding of Albuquerque, to guarantee better representation and trade access for Pueblos in New Mexico's government. Santa Fe was Spain's provincial seat at outbreak of the Mexican War of Independence in 1810. It was considered important to fur traders based in present-day Saint Louis, Missouri. When the area was still under Spanish rule, the Chouteau brothers of Saint Louis gained a monopoly on the fur trade, before the United States acquired Missouri under the Louisiana Purchase of 1803. The fur trade contributed to the wealth of Saint Louis.

In 1841, a small military and trading expedition set out from Austin, intending to take control of the Santa Fe Trail. Known as the Texan Santa Fe Expedition, the force was poorly prepared and was easily captured by the New Mexican military.

United States

In 1846, the United States declared war on Mexico. Brigadier General Stephen W. Kearny led the main body of his Army of the West of some 1,700 soldiers into Santa Fe to claim it and the whole New Mexico Territory for the United States. By 1848 the U.S. officially gained New Mexico through the Treaty of Guadalupe Hidalgo.

Colonel Alexander William Doniphan, under the command of Kearny, recovered ammunition from Santa Fe labeled "Spain 1776" showing both the lack of communications and quality of military support New Mexico received under Mexican rule.

After its annexation, Texas claimed Santa Fe along with other territory in eastern New Mexico. Texas Governor Peter H. Bell sent a letter to President Zachary Taylor, who died before he could read it, demanding that the U.S. Army stop defending New Mexico. In response, Taylor's successor Millard Fillmore stationed additional troops to the area to halt any incursion by the Texas Militia. The territorial dispute was finally resolved by the Compromise of 1850, which designated the 103rd meridian west as Texas's western border.

Some American visitors at first saw little promise in the remote town. One traveller in 1849 wrote:

In 1851, Jean Baptiste Lamy arrived, becoming bishop of New Mexico, Arizona, Utah, and Colorado in 1853. During his leadership, he traveled to France, Rome, Tucson, Los Angeles, St. Louis, New Orleans, and Mexico City. He built the Santa Fe Saint Francis Cathedral and shaped Catholicism in the region until his death in 1888.

As part of the New Mexico Campaign of the Civil War, General Henry Sibley occupied the city, flying the Confederate flag over Santa Fe for a few days in March 1862. Sibley was forced to withdraw after Union troops destroyed his logistical trains following the Battle of Glorieta Pass. The Santa Fe National Cemetery was created by the federal government after the war in 1870 to inter the Union soldiers who died fighting there.

On October 21, 1887, Anton Docher, "The Padre of Isleta", went to New Mexico where he was ordained as a priest in the St Francis Cathedral of Santa Fe by Bishop Jean-Baptiste Salpointe. After a few years serving in Santa Fe, Bernalillo and Taos, he moved to Isleta on December 28, 1891. He wrote an ethnological article published in The Santa Fé Magazine in June 1913, in which he describes early 20th century life in the Pueblos.

As railroads were extended into the West, Santa Fe was originally envisioned as an important stop on the Atchison, Topeka and Santa Fe Railway. But as the tracks were constructed into New Mexico, the civil engineers decided that it was more practical to go through Lamy, a town in Santa Fe County to the south of Santa Fe. A branch line was completed from Lamy to Santa Fe in 1880. The Denver and Rio Grande Western Railroad extended the narrow gauge Chili Line from the nearby city of Española to Santa Fe in 1886.

Neither was sufficient to offset the negative effects of Santa Fe's having been bypassed by the main railroad route. It suffered gradual economic decline into the early 20th century. Activists created a number of resources for the arts and archaeology, notably the School of American Research, created in 1907 under the leadership of the prominent archaeologist Edgar Lee Hewett. In the early 20th century, Santa Fe became a base for numerous writers and artists. The first airplane to fly over Santa Fe was piloted by Rose Dugan, carrying Vera von Blumenthal as passenger. Together the two women started the development of the Pueblo Indian pottery industry, helping native women to market their wares. They contributed to the founding of the annual Santa Fe Indian Market.

In 1912, New Mexico was admitted as the United States of America's 47th state, with Santa Fe as its capital.

20th century

1912 plan
In 1912, when the town's population was approximately 5,000 people, the city's civic leaders designed and enacted a sophisticated city plan that incorporated elements of the contemporary City Beautiful movement, city planning, and historic preservation. The latter was particularly influenced by similar movements in Germany. The plan anticipated limited future growth, considered the scarcity of water, and recognized the future prospects of suburban development on the outskirts. The planners foresaw that its development must be in harmony with the city's character.

Artists and tourists

After the mainline of the railroad bypassed Santa Fe, it lost population. However, artists and writers, as well as retirees, were attracted to the cultural richness of the area, the beauty of the landscapes, and its dry climate. Local leaders began promoting the city as a tourist attraction. The city sponsored architectural restoration projects and erected new buildings according to traditional techniques and styles, thus creating the Santa Fe Style.

Edgar L. Hewett, founder and first director of the School of American Research and the Museum of New Mexico in Santa Fe, was a leading promoter. He began the Santa Fe Fiesta in 1919 and the Southwest Indian Fair in 1922 (now known as the Indian Market). When Hewett tried to attract a summer program for Texas women, many artists rebelled, saying the city should not promote artificial tourism at the expense of its artistic culture. The writers and artists formed the Old Santa Fe Association and defeated the plan.

Japanese-American internment camp 
New Mexico voted against interring any of its citizens of Japanese heritage, so none of the Japanese New Mexicans were interred during World War II. During World War II, the federal government ordered a Japanese-American internment camp to be established. Beginning in June 1942, the Department of Justice arrested 826 Japanese-American men after the attack on Pearl Harbor; they held them near Santa Fe, in a former Civilian Conservation Corps site that had been acquired and expanded for the purpose. Although there was a lack of evidence and no due process, the men were held on suspicion of fifth column activity. Security at Santa Fe was similar to a military prison, with twelve-foot barbed wire fences, guard towers equipped with searchlights, and guards carrying rifles, side arms and tear gas. By September, the internees had been transferred to other facilities—523 to War Relocation Authority concentration camps in the interior of the West, and 302 to Army internment camps.

The Santa Fe site was used next to hold German and Italian nationals, who were considered enemy aliens after the outbreak of war. In February 1943, these civilian detainees were transferred to Department of Justice custody.

The camp was expanded at that time to take in 2,100 men segregated from the general population of Japanese-American inmates. These were mostly  and  who renounced their U.S. citizenship rather than sign an oath to "give up loyalty to the Japanese emperor" (offending them, since they had no identification with the emperor & were being asked to enlist in fighting him while their Japanese-born parents were interned) and other "troublemakers" from the Tule Lake Segregation Center. In 1945, four internees were seriously injured when violence broke out between the internees and guards in an event known as the Santa Fe Riot. The camp remained open past the end of the war; the last detainees were released in mid 1946. The facility was closed and sold as surplus soon after. The camp was located in what is now the Casa Solana neighborhood.

Geography

The Santa Fe River and the arroyos of Santa Fe drain the region to the Rio Grande.

Climate
Santa Fe's climate is characterized by cool, dry winters, hot summers, and relatively low precipitation. Due to the relative aridity and elevation, average diurnal temperature variation exceeds  in every month, and  much of the year. The city usually receives six to eight snowfalls a year between November and April. The heaviest rainfall occurs in July and August, with the arrival of the North American Monsoon.

Spanish and Pueblo influences 

The Spanish laid out the city according to the "Laws of the Indies", town planning rules and ordinances which had been established in 1573 by King Philip II. The fundamental principle was that the town be laid out around a central plaza. On its north side was the Palace of the Governors, while on the east was the church that later became the Cathedral Basilica of Saint Francis of Assisi.

An important style implemented in planning the city was the radiating grid of streets centered on the central Plaza. Many were narrow and included small alley-ways, but each gradually merged into the more casual byways of the agricultural perimeter areas. As the city grew throughout the 19th century, the building styles evolved too, so that by statehood in 1912, the eclectic nature of the buildings caused it to look like "Anywhere USA". The city government realized that the economic decline, which had started more than twenty years before with the railway moving west and the federal government closing down Fort Marcy, might be reversed by the promotion of tourism.

To achieve that goal, the city created the idea of imposing a unified building style – the Spanish Pueblo Revival look, which was based on work done restoring the Palace of the Governors.

After 1912 this style became official: all buildings were to be built using these elements. The city had become "different". However, "in the rush to pueblofy" Santa Fe, the city lost a great deal of its architectural history and eclecticism. Among the architects most closely associated with this new style are T. Charles Gaastra and John Gaw Meem.

By an ordinance passed in 1957, new and rebuilt buildings, especially those in designated historic districts, must exhibit a Spanish Territorial or Pueblo style of architecture, with flat roofs and other features suggestive of the area's traditional adobe construction. However, many contemporary houses in the city are built from lumber, concrete blocks, and other common building materials, but with stucco surfaces (sometimes referred to as "faux-dobe", pronounced as one word: "foe-dough-bee") reflecting the historic style.

In a September 2003 report by Angelou Economics, it was determined that Santa Fe should focus its economic development efforts in the following seven industries: Arts and Culture, Design, Hospitality, Conservation Technologies, Software Development, Publishing and New Media, and Outdoor Gear and Apparel. Three secondary targeted industries for Santa Fe to focus development in are health care, retiree services, and food & beverage. Angelou Economics recognized three economic signs that Santa Fe's economy was at risk of long-term deterioration. These signs were; a lack of business diversity which tied the city too closely to fluctuations in tourism and the government sector; the beginnings of urban sprawl, as a result of Santa Fe County growing faster than the city, meaning people will move farther outside the city to find land and lower costs for housing; and an aging population coupled with a rapidly shrinking population of individuals under 45 years old, making Santa Fe less attractive to business recruits. The seven industries recommended by the report "represent a good mix for short-, mid-, and long-term economic cultivation."

Architectural highlights

 New Mexico State Capitol
 Cathedral Basilica of Saint Francis of Assisi, the mother church of the Roman Catholic Archdiocese of Santa Fe
 Loretto Chapel
 Palace of the Governors
 San Miguel Mission and the rest of the Barrio De Analco Historic District
 Santuario de Guadalupe
 De Vargas Street House
 New Mexico Governor's Mansion

Districts
 Barrio De Analco Historic District
 Don Gaspar Historic District
 Santa Fe Historic District
 Santa Fe Railyard arts district

Demographics

As of the 2020 census, there were 87,505 people living in the city, up from 67,947 in 2010, equating to an annual growth of close to 3%. As per the 2010 census, the racial makeup of the city residents was 78.9% White, 2.1% Native American; 1.4% Black, 1.4% Asian; and 3.7% from two or more races. A total of 48.7% of the population were Hispanic or Latino of any race. Non-Hispanic Whites were 39.5% of the population.

As of the census of 2000, there were 62,203 people, 27,569 households, and 14,969 families living in the city. The population density was 1,666.1 people per square mile (643.4/km2). There were 30,533 housing units at an average density of 817.8 per square mile (315.8/km2). According to the Census Bureau's 2006 American Community Survey, the racial makeup of the city was 75% White, 2.5% Native American, 1.9% Asian, 0.4% African American, 0.3% Pacific Islander, 16.9% from other races, and 3.1% from two or more races. Hispanics or Latinos of any race were 44.5% of the population.

There were 27,569 households, out of which 24.1% had children under the age of 18 living with them, 37.6% were married couples living together, 12.1% had a female householder with no husband present, and 45.7% were non-families. 36.4% of all households were made up of individuals living alone, and 10.2% had someone living alone who was 65 years of age or older. The average household size was 2.20 and the average family size was 2.90.

The age distribution was 20.3% under 18, 8.9% from 18 to 24, 29.0% from 25 to 44, 28.0% from 45 to 64, and 13.9% who were 65 or older. The median age was 40 years. For every 100 females, there were 91.7 males. For every 100 women age 18 and over, there were 89.0 men.

The median income for a household in the city was $40,392, and the median income for a family was $49,705. Men had a median income of $32,373 versus $27,431 for women. The per capita income for the city was $25,454. About 9.5% of families and 12.3% of the population were below the poverty line, including 17.2% of those under age 18 and 9.2% of those age 65 or over.

Arts and culture

The city is well known as a center for arts that reflect the multicultural character of the city; it has been designated as a UNESCO Creative City in Design, Crafts and Folk Art.

In 2012, the city was listed among the 10 best places to retire in the U.S. by CBS MoneyWatch and U.S. News & World Report.

Visual arts

Canyon Road, east of the Plaza, has the highest concentration of art galleries in the city, and is a major destination for international collectors, tourists and locals. The Canyon Road galleries showcase a wide array of contemporary, Southwestern, indigenous American, and experimental art, in addition to Russian, Taos Masters, and Native American pieces.

Since its opening in 1995, SITE Santa Fe has been committed to supporting new developments in contemporary art, encouraging artistic exploration, and expanding traditional museum experiences. Launched in 1995 to organize the only international biennial of contemporary art in the United States, SITE Santa Fe has drawn global attention. The biennials are on par with such renowned exhibitions as the Whitney Biennial and the Venice Biennale.

Santa Fe contains a lively contemporary art scene, with Meow Wolf as its main art collective. Backed by author George R. R. Martin, Meow Wolf opened an elaborate art installation space, called House of Eternal Return, in 2016.

There are many outdoor sculptures, including many statues of Francis of Assisi, and several other holy figures, such as Kateri Tekakwitha. The styles run the whole spectrum from Baroque to Post-modern.

Literature
Numerous authors followed the influx of specialists in the visual arts. Well-known writers like D. H. Lawrence, Cormac McCarthy, Michael Tobias, Kate Braverman, Douglas Adams, Tony Hillerman, Roger Zelazny, Alice Corbin Henderson, Mary Austin, Witter Bynner, Dan Flores, Paul Horgan, Rudolfo Anaya, George R. R. Martin, Mitch Cullin, David Morrell, Evan S. Connell, Richard Bradford, John Masters, Jack Schaefer, Hampton Sides, Ariel Gore and Michael McGarrity are or were residents of Santa Fe. Walker Percy lived on a dude ranch outside of Santa Fe before returning to Louisiana to begin his literary career.

Media
Santa Fe's daily newspaper is the Santa Fe New Mexican and each Friday, it publishes Pasatiempo, its long-running calendar and commentary on arts and events. The Magazine has been the arts magazine of Santa Fe since its founding by Guy Cross in 1992. It publishes critical reviews and profiles New Mexico based artists monthly. Each Wednesday the alternative weekly newspaper, the Santa Fe Reporter, publishes information on the arts and culture of Santa Fe.

Video games
The 2006 racing video game Need For Speed: Carbon has an unused part of its Palmont City setting called San Juan, which you briefly play in, in the tutorial for the game's career mode. The San Juan setting is very loosely based on Santa Fe. It has New Mexico flags all over the roads.
The Crew
The Crew 2

Music, dance, and opera

Performance Santa Fe, formerly the Santa Fe Concert Association, is the oldest presenting organization in Santa Fe. Founded in 1937, Performance Santa Fe brings celebrated and legendary musicians as well as some of the world's greatest dancers and actors to the city year-round. The Santa Fe Opera stages its productions between late June and late August each year. The city also hosts the Santa Fe Chamber Music Festival which is held at about the same time, mostly in the St. Francis Auditorium and in the Lensic Theater.  Also in July and August, the Santa Fe Desert Chorale holds its summer festival. Santa Fe has its own professional ballet company, Aspen Santa Fe Ballet, which performs in both cities and tours nationally and internationally.  Santa Fe is also home to internationally acclaimed Flamenco dancer's María Benítez Institute for Spanish Arts which offers programs and performance in Flamenco, Spanish Guitar and similar arts year round. Other notable local figures include the National Dance Institute of New Mexico and German New Age musician Deuter.

Museums

Santa Fe has many museums located near the downtown Plaza:
 New Mexico Museum of Art – collections of modern and contemporary Southwestern art
 Museum of Contemporary Native Arts – contemporary Native American arts with political aspects
 Georgia O'Keeffe Museum – devoted to the work of O'Keeffe and others whom she influenced
 New Mexico History Museum – located behind the Palace of the Governors
 Site Santa Fe – a contemporary art space

Several other museums are located in the area known as Museum Hill:
 Museum of International Folk Art – folk art from around the world
 Museum of Indian Arts and Culture – Native American arts
 Wheelwright Museum of the American Indian – Native American art and history
 Museum of Spanish Colonial Art – Tradition arts from the Spanish-colonial era to contemporary times.

Sports
The New Mexico Style were an American Basketball Association franchise founded in 2005, but reformed in Texas for the 2007–08 season as the El Paso S'ol (which folded without playing an ABA game in their new city). The Santa Fe Roadrunners were a North American Hockey League team, but moved to Kansas to become the Topeka Roadrunners. Santa Fe's rodeo, the Rodeo De Santa Fe, is held annually the last week of June.
In May 2012, Santa Fe became the home of the Santa Fe Fuego of the Pecos League of Professional Baseball Clubs. They play their home games at Fort Marcy Ballfield. Horse racing events were held at The Downs at Santa Fe from 1971 until 1997.

Government

The city of Santa Fe is a charter city. It is governed by a mayor-council system. The city is divided into four electoral districts, each represented by two councilors. Councilors are elected to staggered four-year terms and one councilor from each district is elected every two years.

The municipal judgeship is an elected position and a requirement of the holder is that they be a member of the state bar. The judge is elected to four-year terms.

The mayor is the chief executive officer of the city and is a member of the governing body. The mayor has numerous powers and duties, and while previously the mayor could only vote when there was a tie among the city council, the city charter was amended by referendum in 2014 to allow the mayor to vote on all matters in front of the council. Starting in 2018, the position of mayor will be a full-time professional paid position within city government. Day-to-day operations of the municipality are undertaken by the city manager's office.

Federal operations
The Joseph M. Montoya Federal Building and Post Office serves as an office for U.S. federal government operations. It also contains the primary United States Postal Service post office in the city. Other post offices in the Santa Fe city limits include Coronado, De Vargas Mall, and Santa Fe Place Mall. The U.S. Courthouse building, constructed in 1889, was added to the National Register of Historic Places in 1973.

Tourism

Tourism is a major element of the Santa Fe economy, with visitors attracted year-round by the climate and related outdoor activities (such as skiing in years of adequate snowfall; hiking in other seasons) plus cultural activities of the city and the region. Tourism information is provided by the convention and visitor bureau and the chamber of commerce.

Most tourist activity takes place in the historic downtown, especially on and around the Plaza, a one-block square adjacent to the Palace of the Governors, the original seat of New Mexico's territorial government since the time of Spanish colonization. Other areas include "Museum Hill", the site of the major art museums of the city as well as the Santa Fe International Folk Art Market, which takes place each year during the second full weekend of July. The Canyon Road arts area with its galleries is also a major attraction for locals and visitors alike.

Some visitors find Santa Fe particularly attractive around the second week of September when the aspens in the Sangre de Cristo Mountains turn yellow and the skies are clear and blue. This is also the time of the annual Fiestas de Santa Fe, celebrating the "reconquering" of Santa Fe by Don Diego de Vargas, a highlight of which is the burning Zozobra ("Old Man Gloom"), a  marionette.

Chimayo is also nearby and many locals complete the annual pilgrimage to the Santuario de Chimayo.

Science and technology
Santa Fe has had an association with science and technology since 1943 when the town served as the gateway to Los Alamos National Laboratory (LANL), a 45-minute drive from the city. In 1984, the Santa Fe Institute (SFI) was founded to research complex systems in the physical, biological, economic, and political sciences. It has hosted such Nobel laureates as Murray Gell-Mann (physics), Philip Warren Anderson (physics), and Kenneth Arrow (economics). The National Center for Genome Resources (NCGR) was founded in 1994 to focus on research at the intersection among bioscience, computing, and mathematics. In the 1990s and 2000s several technology companies formed to commercialize technologies from LANL, SFI and NCGR.

Due to the presence of Los Alamos National Laboratory, Sandia National Laboratories and the Santa Fe Institute, and because of its attractiveness for visitors and an established tourist industry, Santa Fe routinely serves as a host to a variety of scientific meetings, summer schools, and public lectures, such as International q-bio Conference on Cellular Information Processing, Santa Fe Institute's Complex Systems Summer School, and LANL's Center For Nonlinear Studies Annual Conference.

Education

Santa Fe has three public high schools:
 Santa Fe High School (1,500 students)
 Capital High School (1,300 students)
 New Mexico School for the Arts (200 students)

Public schools in Santa Fe are operated by Santa Fe Public Schools, with the exception of the New Mexico School for the Arts, which is a public/private partnership comprising the NMSA-Art Institute, a nonprofit art educational institution, and NMSA-Charter School, an accredited New Mexico state charter high school.

The city's institutions of higher education include St. John's College, a liberal arts college; the Institute of American Indian Arts, a tribal college for Native American arts; Southwestern College, a graduate school for counseling and art therapy; and Santa Fe Community College.

The city has six private college preparatory high schools: Santa Fe Waldorf School, St. Michael's High School, Desert Academy, New Mexico School for the Deaf, Santa Fe Secondary School, Santa Fe Preparatory School, and the Mandela International Magnet School. The Santa Fe Indian School is an off-reservation school for Native Americans. Santa Fe is also the location of the New Mexico School for the Arts, a public-private partnership, arts-focused high school. The city has many private elementary schools as well, including Little Earth School, Santa Fe International Elementary School, Rio Grande School, Desert Montessori School, La Mariposa Montessori, The Tara School, Fayette Street Academy, The Santa Fe Girls' School, The Academy for the Love of Learning, and Santa Fe School for the Arts and Sciences.

Transportation

Air
Santa Fe is served by the Santa Fe Municipal Airport. American Airlines provides regional jet service to Dallas/Fort Worth International Airport and Phoenix Sky Harbor International Airport. United Airlines has regional jet service to Denver International Airport.

Road
Santa Fe is located on I-25. In addition, U.S. Routes 84 and 285 pass through the city, along St. Francis Drive. NM-599 forms a limited-access road bypass around the northwestern part of the city.

In its earliest alignment (1926–1937), U.S. Route 66 ran through Santa Fe.

Public transportation

Santa Fe Trails, run by the city, operates a number of bus routes within the city during business hours and also provides connections to regional transit.

The New Mexico Rail Runner Express is a commuter rail service operating in Valencia, Bernalillo (including Albuquerque), Sandoval, and Santa Fe Counties. In Santa Fe County, the service uses  of new right-of-way connecting the BNSF Railway's old transcontinental mainline to existing right-of-way in Santa Fe used by the Santa Fe Southern Railway. Santa Fe is currently served by four stations, Santa Fe Depot, South Capitol, Zia Road, and Santa Fe County/NM 599.

New Mexico Park and Ride, a division of the New Mexico Department of Transportation, and the North Central Regional Transit District operate primarily weekday commuter coach/bus service to Santa Fe from Torrance, Rio Arriba, Taos, San Miguel and Los Alamos Counties in addition to shuttle services within Santa Fe connecting major government activity centers. Prior to the Rail Runner's extension to Santa Fe, Park and Ride operated commuter coach service between Albuquerque and Santa Fe.

Greyhound Lines serves Santa Fe on its route from Denver to El Paso, Texas. Groome Transportation provides shuttles between Santa Fe and the Albuquerque International Sunport.

Rail
Along with the New Mexico Rail Runner Express, a commuter rail line serving the metropolitan areas of Albuquerque and Santa Fe, the city or its environs are served by two other railroads. The Santa Fe Southern Railway, now mostly a tourist rail experience but also carrying freight, operates excursion services out of Santa Fe as far as Lamy,  to the southeast. The Santa Fe Southern line is one of the United States' few rails with trails. Lamy is also served by Amtrak's daily Southwest Chief for train service to Chicago, Los Angeles, and intermediate points. Passengers transiting Lamy may use a special connecting coach/van service to reach Santa Fe.

Trails
Multi-use bicycle, pedestrian, and equestrian trails are increasingly popular in Santa Fe, for both recreation and commuting. These include the Dale Ball Trails, a  network starting within two miles of the Santa Fe Plaza; the long Santa Fe Rail Trail to Lamy; the Atalaya Trail up Atalaya Mountain; and the Santa Fe River Trail. Santa Fe is the terminus of three National Historic Trails: El Camino Real de Tierra Adentro National Historic Trail, the Old Spanish National Historic Trail, and the Santa Fe National Historic Trail.

Sister cities and twin towns
Santa Fe's sister cities are:

  Bukhara, Bukhara Region, Uzbekistan (1988)
  Hidalgo del Parral, Chihuahua,  Mexico (1984)
  Holguín, Holguín Province, Cuba (2001)
  Icheon, Gyeonggi-do, South Korea (2013)
  Livingstone, Southern Province, Zambia (2012)
  San Miguel de Allende, Guanajuato, Mexico (1992)
  Santa Fe, Granada Province, Spain (1983)
  Sorrento, Campania, Italy (1995)
  Tsuyama, Okayama, Japan (1992)
  Zhangjiajie, Hunan, China (2009)

Notable people

 David W. Alexander (1812–1886), Los Angeles politician and sheriff
 Antonio Armijo (1804–1850), explorer and merchant who led the first commercial caravan between Santa Fe,  and Los Angeles,  in 1829–1830
 Mary Hunter Austin (1868–1934), writer
 Gustave Baumann (1881–1971), print-maker, marionette-maker and painter; resident artist for more than fifty years; died in Santa Fe
 William Berra (born 1952), painter
 Florence Birdwell (1924–2021), musician, teacher
 Ned Bittinger (born 1951), portrait painter and illustrator
 Merrill Brockway (1923–2013), Emmy Award-winning producer, director
 Dana Tai Soon Burgess (born 1968), dancer, choreographer
 Paul Burlin (1886–1969), modern and abstract expressionist painter
 Witter Bynner (1881–1968), poet
 Julia Cameron (1948), author of The Artist's Way
 Dana B. Chase (1848–1897), photographer
 Zach Condon (born 1986), lead singer and songwriter of band Beirut
 Bronson M. Cutting (1888–1935), politician, newspaper publisher and military attaché
 Chris Eyre (born 1968), actor, director
 Jane Fonda (born 1937), actress; owner of Forked Lightning Ranch
 Tom Ford (born 1961), fashion designer

 Garance Franke-Ruta (born 1972), journalist
 T. Charles Gaastra (1879–1947), architect in the Pueblo Revival Style
 Greer Garson (1904–1996), actress and philanthropist
 Laura Gilpin, (1891–1979), photographer and author
 John Grubesic (born 1965), New Mexico State Senator, representing the 25th District as a Democrat
 Anna Gunn (born 1968), Emmy-winning actress
 Gene Hackman (born 1930), Oscar-winning actor
 Edgar Lee Hewett (1865–1946), archaeologist and anthropologist
 Dorothy B. Hughes (1904–1993), novelist and literary critic
 John Brinckerhoff Jackson (1909–1996), landscape architect
 Jeffe Kennedy, author
 Matt King, artist, co-founder of Meow Wolf
 Jean Kraft (1927–2021), operatic singer (mezzo-soprano)

 Oliver La Farge (1901–1963), writer
 Jean Baptiste LeLande (1778–1821), merchant
 Jean-Baptiste Lamy (1814–1888), first Archbishop of Santa Fe
 Marjorie Herrera Lewis (born 1957), author
 Ali MacGraw (born 1939), actress
 Shirley MacLaine (born 1934), actress
 George R. R. Martin (born 1948), author and screenwriter, Game of Thrones
 Cormac McCarthy (born 1933), author, winner of Pulitzer Prize for Fiction
 Christine McHorse (1948–2021), ceramic artist
 Dorothy McKibbin (1897–1985), gatekeeper and point-of-contact for personnel at the Manhattan Project
 John Gaw Meem (1894–1983) Architect who popularized the Pueblo Revival style
 Sylvanus Morley (1883–1948), archaeologist and Mayanist
 John Nieto (1936–2018), contemporary artist
 Jesse L. Nusbaum (1887–1975), archaeologist, anthropologist, photographer and National Park Service Superintendent
 Georgia O'Keeffe (1887–1986), artist, winner of National Medal of Arts
 Elliot Porter (1901–1990), photographer
 Robert Redford (born 1936), actor, director
 Wendy Rule (born 1966) Australian-born musician
 Hib Sabin (born 1935), indigenous-style sculptor
 Manuel de Sandoval, colonial governor of Texas. He was the only native of New Mexico that governed Spanish Texas
 Brad Sherwood (born 1964), actor and comedian
 Wes Studi (born 1947), actor and musician
 Teal Swan (born 1984), spiritual guru and author
 Sheri S. Tepper (1929–2016), writer
 Charlene Teters (born 1952), artist, activist
 Michael Charles Tobias (born 1951), author and global ecologist
 Stanislaw Ulam (1909–1984), mathematician associated with the Manhattan Project
 Jeremy Ray Valdez (born 1980), actor
 Lew Wallace (1827–1905), territorial governor 1878–1881, and author of Ben-Hur
 Tuesday Weld (born 1943), actress
 Josh West (born 1977), Olympic medalist rower and Earth Sciences professor
 Roger Zelazny (1937–1995), writer
 Pinchas Zukerman (born 1948), violinist, conductor

See also
 Homewise, founded in 1986
 National Old Trails Road
 Santa Fe Trail

References

Further reading

External links

 
 Santa Fe Convention & Visitors Bureau official tourism website
 Santa Fe Chamber of Commerce
 

Santa Fe
Cities in New Mexico
Cities in Santa Fe County, New Mexico
County seats in New Mexico
Populated places established in 1610
1610 establishments in New Spain